The Seva Dal is the grassroots front organization of the Indian National Congress. The organization has a chapter in all the states of India. The members of the organization are known for wearing the Gandhi topi. It is headed by a Chief Organiser Shri Lalji Desai Ji.

History 
In 1923, following the Flag Satyagraha at Nagpur, many activists of the Congress were arrested and sentenced to prison. Unable to tolerate the rigors of prison, most of them tendered written apologies to the colonial authorities. However, members of the Hubli Seva Mandal, founded by N. S. Hardikar refused to yield. This uncompromising stance gained the attention of the Congress' national leadership that had gathered in Nagpur to participate in the satyagraha. It was here that the idea of establishing an organisation of volunteers to combat the Raj was born. At the Kakinada session of the Congress in 1923, a board under Dr N S Hardikar was constituted for setting up the Dal. The Seva Dal was established as the Hindustani Seva Mandal on 1 January 1924. According to the resolution at Kakinada, the Dal was to work under the supervision of the Congress party's working committee. Jawaharlal Nehru was its first president. The Dal faced much initial opposition from Congressmen, who were opposed to the idea of creating a militia like organisation in the Congress, seeing it as a threat to the idea of civilian dominance and as being inconsistent with the idea of non-violence. Umabai Kundapur was the founding president of the women's wing of the Dal.  Kamaladevi Chattopadhyay was closely associated with the organisation, especially in the 1930s.

In 1931, the Congress Working Committee decided to rename the Hindustani Seva Dal as the Congress Seva Dal, making it the central volunteer organisation of the Congress. Every province was to have a general officer commanding the provincial Seva Dal. The organisation also focused specifically on three categories of people: children, adolescents and adults. All Seva Dal members were required to take an oath, which, among other things, required them to stay aloof from political activity in the Congress. RSS founder Dr. K.B. Hedgewar was also associated with the Congress Seva Dal's predecessor - Hindustani Seva Dal

The task of imparting training and organising volunteers was given to the Dal in 1938, which was then headquartered in the Karnatak district of the Bombay presidency. Under Hardikar, an academy for physical training was established and training camps established at several places across India. During the Civil Disobedience Movement, the Seva Dal played an stellar role in enrolling new members in the Congress, organising activities like picketing and in arming the party with an organised but peaceful militia. The significance of the Dal in the Civil Disobedience Movement can be gauged from the fact that in 1934, when the Movement came to an end and the colonial authorities lifted the ban on the Congress and its organisations, they continued to proscribe the Dal.

Past Presidents 
Suresh Pachouri

Controversies
Colonial Government of India banned Seva Dal in 1932 for setting up a women's army. The ban was never lifted.

West Bengal government banned Seva Dal in 1948. Jawaharlal Nehru got the ban lifted. on the principle that bans are  justified only under exceptional circumstances.

References 

Military units and formations established in 1923
Indian National Congress
Indian National Congress organisations
Military wings of nationalist parties
1923 establishments in India